George Litton Jr. (born c. 1935) is a former American football coach. He served as the head football coach at Gardner–Webb University in Boiling Springs, North Carolina from 1970 to 1974, compiling a record of 16–35.
Litton was also the head football coach at Lees–McRae College in Banner Elk, North Carolina from 1962 to 1969, when the school was a junior college.

A native of Big Stone Gap, Virginia, Litton played college football as an end at East Tennessee State College—now known as East Tennessee State University.

Head coaching record

College

References

Year of birth missing (living people)
1930s births
Living people
American football ends
East Tennessee State Buccaneers football coaches
East Tennessee State Buccaneers football players
Gardner–Webb Runnin' Bulldogs football coaches
Lees–McRae Bobcats athletic directors
Lees–McRae Bobcats football coaches
High school football coaches in Virginia
People from Big Stone Gap, Virginia
Players of American football from Virginia